The discography of the South Korean girl group Dal Shabet consist of one studio album, one compilation album, ten extended plays, five soundtrack appearances, five collaborations, fifteen music videos and nine promotional singles.

Albums

Studio albums

Compilation albums

Extended plays

Singles

Collaborations

Soundtracks

Videography

Music videos

References

External links
 Dal Shabet's discography on Melon

Discographies of South Korean artists
K-pop music group discographies